ZeptoLab (stylised as zeptolab) is a Spanish multinational video game developer best known for developing the Cut the Rope series, which has been downloaded more than 2 billion times since its release, and can be played on major platforms including Android, iOS, Windows Phone, HTML5 Internet browsers, macOS, Nintendo DSi and Nintendo 3DS.

ZeptoLab has also announced licensing and merchandising partnerships for Cut the Rope and its popular character, Om Nom.

History
ZeptoLab was founded in 2008 by self-taught twins Efim and Semyon Voinov, who have been making games since the age of ten. “Zepto”, a math prefix meaning 10−21, was “meant to signify how truly boutique their operation was.”

ZeptoLab has not received any external funding to produce their games. It also owns a game studio subsidiary in the UK and started a publishing division in 2017. Company's HQ was moved to Barcelona in 2015.

List of games released
 Cut the Rope (October 1, 2010)
 Cut the Rope: Holiday Gift (December 1, 2010)
 Cut the Rope: Experiments (August 23, 2011)
 Pudding Monsters (December 19, 2012 on iOS / December 21, 2012 on Android / February 25, 2022 on Nintendo Switch)
 Cut the Rope: Time Travel (April 18, 2013)
 Cut the Rope 2 (December 19, 2013 on iOS / March 28, 2014 on Android)   
 King of Thieves (February 12, 2015 on App Store (iOS/iPadOS) / February 26, 2015 on Amazon Appstore / March 5, 2015 on Google Play).
 My Om Nom (December 18, 2014 on iOS / Android (August 17, 2015) (in collaboration with Dynamic Pixels).
 Cut The Rope: Magic (December 17, 2015)
 Om Nom Bubbles (December 18, 2015 / August 30, 2021 on Android devices)
 C.A.T.S - Crash Arena Turbo Stars (April 20, 2017)
 Om Nom Maya Papaya (January 22, 2018)
 Where's Om Nom (March 11, 2019)
 Om Nom: Merge (November 28, 2019) (in collaboration with Amuzo Games)
 Om Nom: Run (February 20, 2020) (in collaboration with Koukoi Games Oy)
 Bullet Echo (May 27, 2020)
 Robotics! (August 5, 2020)
 Evo Pop (November 11, 2020)
 Cut The Rope Remastered (April 2, 2021 on Apple Arcade) (Developed and published by Paladin Studios)
 Downhill Smash (November 30, 2021 on Android / December 1, 2021 on iOS) (in collaboration with Hipster Whale)
 Overcrowded: Tycoon (April 26, 2022 on Android / March 3, 2022 on iOS)
 Marched Full Fly (July 5, 2023 on iOS)

References

External links 

 

Video game companies established in 2009
Video game development companies
Video game companies of Russia